Paolo Giordano (5 July 1962 – 29 December 2021) was an Italian guitarist.

Biography
Giordano was a pioneer of advanced percussive techniques on the acoustic guitar in Italy.

He died from COVID-19 in Pescara on 29 December 2021, at the age of 59.

Discography
Paolo Giordano (1994)
Kid in a toyshop (2000)
Have You Seen the Roses? (2008)

References

External links
 

1962 births
2021 deaths
Italian guitarists
People from Pescara
Deaths from the COVID-19 pandemic in Abruzzo